SM UB-5 was a German Type UB I submarine or U-boat in the Imperial German Navy during World War I. She sank five ships during her career and was broken up in Germany in 1919.

UB-5 was ordered in October 1914 and was laid down at the Germaniawerft shipyard in Kiel in November. She carried two torpedoes for her two bow torpedo tubes and was also armed with a deck-mounted machine gun. UB-5 was broken into sections and shipped by rail to Antwerp for reassembly. She was launched and commissioned there as SM UB-5 in March 1915.

UB-5 was initially assigned to the Flanders Flotilla in March 1915 and sank five British ships of  under the command of Wilhelm Smiths. The U-boat was assigned to the Baltic Flotilla in October 1915, and relegated to a training role from September 1916. At the end of the war, UB-5 was deemed unseaworthy and unable to surrender at Harwich with the rest of Germany's U-boat fleet. She remained in Germany where she was broken up by Dräger at Lübeck, Germany, in 1919.

Design and construction 
After the German Army's rapid advance along the North Sea coast in the earliest stages of World War I, the Imperial German Navy found itself without suitable submarines that could be operated in the narrow and shallow environment off Flanders. Project 34, a design effort begun in mid-August 1914, produced the Type UB I design: a small submarine that could be shipped by rail to a port of operations and quickly assembled. UB-5 was part of the initial allotment of eight submarines—numbered  to —ordered on 15 October from Germaniawerft of Kiel, just shy of two months after planning for the class began.

UB-5 was laid down by Germaniawerft in Kiel on 22 November. She had a single  Daimler 4-cylinder diesel engine for surface travel, and a single  Siemens-Schuckert electric motor for underwater travel, both attached to a single propeller shaft.

UB-5 was armed with two  torpedoes in two bow torpedo tubes. She was also outfitted for a single  machine gun on deck. UB-5s standard complement consisted of one officer and thirteen enlisted men.

After work on UB-5 was complete at the Germaniwerft yard, UB-5 was readied for rail shipment. The process of shipping a UB I boat involved breaking the submarine down into what was essentially a knock down kit. Each boat was broken into approximately fifteen pieces and loaded onto eight railway flatcars. In early 1915, the sections of UB-5 were shipped to Antwerp for assembly in what was typically a two- to three-week process. After UB-5 was assembled and launched sometime in March, she was loaded on a barge and taken through canals to Bruges where she underwent trials.

Service career 
The submarine was commissioned into the German Imperial Navy as SM UB-5 on 25 March under the command of Oberleutnant zur See Wilhelm Smiths, a 28-year-old first-time U-boat commander.
UB-5 soon joined the other UB I boats then comprising the Flanders Flotilla, which had been organized on 29 March. When UB-5 joined the flotilla, Germany was in the midst of its first submarine offensive, begun in February. During this campaign, enemy vessels in the German-defined war zone, which encompassed all waters around the United Kingdom (including the English Channel), were to be sunk. Vessels of neutral countries were not to be attacked unless they definitively could be identified as enemy vessels operating under a false flag.

The UB I boats of the Flanders Flotilla were initially limited to patrols in the Hoofden, the southern portion of the North Sea between the United Kingdom and the Netherlands. UB-4 made the first sortie of the flotilla on 9 April, and UB-5 departed on her first patrol soon after. On 15 April,  from the North Hinder lightship, UB-5 scored her first success when she torpedoed and sank the British steamer Ptarmigan. The 784 GRT steamer was carrying a general cargo from Rotterdam to London when she went down with the loss of eight crewmen.

After UB-5s sister boat  pioneered a route around past British anti-submarine nets and mines in the Straits of Dover in late June, boats of the flotilla began to patrol the western English Channel. , UB-5, and  soon followed with patrols in the Channel, but were hampered by fog and bad weather. Even though none of the boats sank any ships, by successfully completing their voyages they helped further prove the feasibility of defeating the British countermeasures in the Straits of Dover.

All four of the smacks—sailing vessels traditionally rigged with red ochre sails—were stopped, boarded by crewmen from UB-5, and sunk with explosives. These were the last ships UB-5 sank during the war.

Germany's submarine offensive was suspended on 18 September by the chief of the Admiralstab, Admiral Henning von Holtzendorff, In response to American demands after the sinking of the Cunard Line steamer  in May 1915 and other high-profile sinkings in August and September. Holtzendorff's directive from ordered all U-boats out of the English Channel and the South-Western Approaches and required that all submarine activity in the North Sea be conducted strictly along prize regulations. Shortly after this cessation, UB-5 was transferred to the Baltic Flotilla on 9 October.

Boats of the Baltic flotilla were based at either Kiel, Danzig, or Libau, but where UB-5 was stationed during this time is not reported in sources. On 21 September 1916, UB-5 was transferred to training duties. According to authors R.H. Gibson and Maurice Prendergast, submarines assigned to training duties were "war-worn craft" unfit for service. At the end of the war, the Allies required all German U-boats to be sailed to Harwich for surrender. UB-5 was one of eight U-boats deemed unseaworthy and allowed to remain in Germany. UB-5 was broken up by Dräger at Lübeck in 1919.

Summary of raiding history

Notes

References

Bibliography 

 

 
 
 
 
 
 

German Type UB I submarines
Ships built in Kiel
Ships built in Belgium
1915 ships
U-boats commissioned in 1915
World War I submarines of Germany